Aiaiaiaiaiai is the first release by the Ukrainian rock band Vopli Vidopliassova. It was released in 1987 and had no album cover. The band no longer considers it an official release.

The majority of the album's tracks are in Russian.

Track list 
Lyrics by Oleg Ovchar; music by Yuri Zdorenko.

The tracks "Na volyo" is also known as "Uga-ga" by fans. The track "Kvartira No. 119" was renamed "Rassvet" in the late 1980s and appears under this title on Abo abo (1992). In 2002, Yuri Zdorenko's band Borshch released new versions of the songs, called "Uvaga" and "Konforka", on the Borshch EP. The Borshch EP also contained a new version of "Ya letel".

In 2010, the song "Konspekt" was reworked as "Vidpustka" and released as a single. It also appears on their 2013 album Chudovy svit.

A different song called "Ai-ai-ai" was performed at the band's concerts between 1994 and 1997, and was recorded in the studio for the first time in 2019, being released as a single.

References 

1987 albums
Vopli Vidopliassova albums